The Commissario Spada was an Italian comics series published on the Catholic weekly magazine Il Giornalino from 1970 to 1982, created by Gianluigi Gonano and Gianni De Luca. Featuring the adventures of a widower commissioner working in the criminal police of Milan, and his son Mario, it is one of the earliest examples of realistic themes in Italian comics.

References

External links
 Page at ubcfumetti.com 

Italian comics characters
Comics characters introduced in 1970
Spada, Commissario
1970 comics debuts
1982 comics endings
Italian comics titles
Crime comics
Drama comics
Comics about police officers
Fictional Italian people
Spada, Commissario
Fictional characters from Milan